Branislav Mihajlović (22 December 1936 – 11 October 1991) was a Serbian footballer who played nearly his entire career for FK Partizan.

Playing career

Club career
Mihajlović is tenth on Partizan's all-time goals list with 183 goals in total (appearing in 286 games in total).

International career
He earned eight caps and scored four goals for the Yugoslavian national team.

References

1936 births
1991 deaths
People from Vranje
Serbian footballers
Yugoslav footballers
Yugoslavia international footballers
Association football forwards
Yugoslav First League players
FK Partizan players
OFK Beograd players